Defending champion Ken Rosewall defeated Mal Anderson in the final, 7–6(7–2), 6–3, 7–5 to win the men's singles tennis title at the 1972 Australian Open.

Seeds
The seeded players are listed below. Ken Rosewall is the champion; others show the round in which they were eliminated.

  John Newcombe (quarterfinals)
  Ken Rosewall (champion)
  John Alexander (third round)
  Alex Metreveli (semifinals)
  Owen Davidson (second round)
  Tony Roche (withdrew before the tournament began)
  Colin Dibley (third round)
  Mal Anderson (finals)
  Dick Crealy (quarterfinals)
  Allan Stone (semifinals)
  John Cooper (quarterfinals)
  Geoff Masters (second round)

Draw

Key
 Q = Qualifier
 WC = Wild card
 LL = Lucky loser
 r = Retired

Final eight

Section 1

Section 2

Section 3

Section 4

External links
 Association of Tennis Professionals (ATP) – 1972 Australian Open Men's Singles draw
 1972 Australian Open – Men's draws and results at the International Tennis Federation

Mens singles
Australian Open (tennis) by year – Men's singles